José Luis Aussín Suárez (born 20 January 1942) is a Mexican former footballer. He competed in the men's tournament at the 1964 Summer Olympics.

References

External links
 

1942 births
Living people
Mexican footballers
Mexico international footballers
Olympic footballers of Mexico
Footballers at the 1964 Summer Olympics
Place of birth missing (living people)
Association football forwards
C.D. Veracruz footballers